Oaxaca is a state in Mexico.

Oaxaca may also refer to:

 Oaxaca City, a city and municipality in the state of Oaxaca, Mexico
 Oaxaca cheese, Mexican cheese
 Oaxaca (ship)
 Alebrijes de Oaxaca, a Mexican football team
 Blinder-Oaxaca decomposition, a method in econometrics
 Oaxaca (album), a live compilation CD by American jazz pianist/composer Vince Guaraldi

Persons with the surname
 Ronald Oaxaca (born  1943), American economist